Seko Mohamed Fofana (born 7 May 1995) is a professional footballer who plays as a midfielder for Ligue 1 club Lens. Born in France, he represents the Ivory Coast national team.

Club career

Manchester City
Born in Paris, France, Fofana began his youth career at Paris FC when he was nine and stayed there for six years before joining Lorient. After two years at Lorient, he moved to England when he joined Premier League side Manchester City in 2013 and was immediately sent to the development squad.

Fofana began to be a regular in the under-18s in the 2013–14 season, making 20 appearances and scoring 5 goals in the league and playing 7 times scoring twice in the club's UEFA Youth League campaign against CSKA Moscow and Benfica Juniors. During Manchester City's U21 friendly match against HNK Rijeka, he was racially abused by one of the opposition player just before half-time. As a result, players from Manchester City's U21 squad walked off the pitch, prompting the match to be cancelled. After the match, Manager Patrick Vieira praised the action of the players to walk out.

Fulham (loan)
On 27 November 2014, Fofana signed for Championship side Fulham on loan until 31 January 2015. He made his Fulham debut two days later, where he came on as a substitute for Emerson Hyndman in the 63rd minute, in a 2–1 win over Brighton & Hove Albion. His form and performance convinced Fulham to extend the loan spell until the end of the season. He scored his first goal for the club on 21 March 2015 to secure a 2–0 win away to Huddersfield Town. Having established himself under the management of Kit Symons, Fofana went on to make 25 appearances scoring once before returning to his parent club.

Bastia (loan)
After making two appearances for City during their pre-season tour in Australia (playing the second half of a 2–0 win over Adelaide United, and coming on as a late substitute in Manchester City's 1–0 win over Melbourne City), the Premier League club agreed to send Fofana out on loan again to gain further experience. The Frenchman subsequently returned to his native France, to join Bastia on a season-long loan on 29 July 2015. He made his Ligue 1 debut in the opening game of the season 10 days later, on 8 August 2015, playing the full 90 minutes in a 2−1 win at home to Rennes. He then scored his first goal on 12 December 2015, in a 1–1 draw against Troyes, followed up by assisting in the next game on 19 December 2015, in a 2–0 win over Reims. In a 1–0 win over Montpellier on 16 January 2016, Fofana received a straight red card in the 65th minutes. After the match, he was given a four match ban and Fofana, himself, apologised for his action. In total, he made 32 appearances and scoring once for Bastia.

Udinese
After three years at Manchester City, Fofana joined Serie A side Udinese, signing a five-year deal for worth £2.5 million. In addition, the move included a possible €2 million bonus and Bastia receiving 15% of the total compensation, up to €700K. Fofana made his Udinese debut in the opening game of the season playing 79 minutes before being substituted, in a 4–0 loss against Roma.

Lens 
On 18 August 2020, Fofana signed a four-year contract with RC Lens. He scored his first goal on 21 February 2021 against Dijon. After a string of good performances, he was awarded the Ligue 1 Player of the Month for September 2021. In May 2022, Fofana won the Prix Marc-Vivien Foé as the best African player in France's top flight for the 2021–22 campaign, following a season in which he scored eight goals in 37 appearances. On 31 August 2022, he signed a contract extension with the club until 2025.

International career
Fofana was eligible to play for France and Ivory Coast, as his parents come from there. Fofana previously represented France U16, France U17, France U18 and France U19. On 3 April 2017, Fofana chose to represent the Ivory Coast, the country of his parents.

Fofana made his debut for Ivory Coast in a 2–0 2018 FIFA World Cup qualification loss to Morocco on 11 November 2017.

Career statistics

Club

International

International goals
Scores and results list Ivory Coast's goal tally first, score column indicates score after each Fofana goal.

Honours
Individual
 UNFP Ligue 1 Team of the Year: 2021–22
 Prix Marc-Vivien Foé: 2021–22
 UNFP Ligue 1 Player of the Month: September 2021

References

External links

 

1995 births
Living people
Footballers from Paris
Association football midfielders
Citizens of Ivory Coast through descent
Ivorian footballers
Ivory Coast international footballers
French footballers
France youth international footballers
French sportspeople of Ivorian descent
English Football League players
Ligue 1 players
Serie A players
Manchester City F.C. players
Fulham F.C. players
SC Bastia players
Udinese Calcio players
RC Lens players
French expatriate footballers
Expatriate footballers in England
Expatriate footballers in Italy
French expatriate sportspeople in England